Berdigestyakh (Bercigesteex) is a rural locality (a selo) and the administrative center of Gorny District in the Sakha Republic, Russia. Its population as of the 2010 Census was 6,462, up from 6,149 recorded during the 2002 Census. Berdigestyakh is located by the Matta River.

References

Notes

Sources
Official website of the Sakha Republic. Registry of the Administrative-Territorial Divisions of the Sakha Republic. Gorny District. 

Rural localities in Gorny District